Man is both a surname and a given name. Notable people with the name include:

Surname
 Man Chong (died 242), a government official in the state of Cao Wei
 Felix H. Man (1893–1985), German photographer, photojournalist, and art collector
 Henry Man (died 1556), English Bishop of Sodor and Man
 John Man (1512–1569), English churchman, college head and diplomat
 Man Pei Tak (born 1982), Hong Kong footballer
 Phoebe Man, Hong Kong artist
 Janice Man (born 1988), Hong Kong actress

Given name
 Man Mohan Adhikari (1920–1999), Prime Minister of Nepal
 Man Parrish (born 1958), American composer, songwriter, vocalist and producer
 Man Ray (1890-1976), American modernist artist
 Man Singh I (1550–1614), King of Amber (now Jaipur) and Mughal general
 Ip Man (1893–1972), Chinese martial artist
 Zhong Man (born 1983), Chinese saber fencer and 2008 Olympic gold medalist
 Man Haron Monis (1964–2014) Iranian-Australian Muslim cleric and criminal, perpetrator of 2014 Sydney siege

See also
 Mann (surname)
 Wan (surname), romanized as Man in Cantonese
 Wen (surname), romanized as Man in Cantonese